The FAI Futsal Cup is a cup competition organized by the Football Association of Ireland for futsal teams based in the Republic of Ireland. The winners qualify to represent the Republic of Ireland in the UEFA Futsal Cup. The competition was introduced in 2007 and the inaugural winners were Shamrock Rovers. The 2007 tournament was referred to as the Eircom U21 Futsal League and the 2008 and 2009 tournaments were referred to as the Futsal League of Ireland or the FAI National Futsal League. Since 2010 it has generally been referred to as the Ireland Futsal Union Cup.

History

Early tournaments   
The FAI Futsal Cup was originally awarded to the winners of the Eircom U21 Futsal League, a tournament featuring futsal teams attached to clubs playing in the League of Ireland U21 Division. The competition was officially launched at Dublin City University on 13 February 2007 with a reception attended by, among others, Packie Bonner. Eights clubs from the U21 Division, including Bohemians, Bray Wanderers, Drogheda United, Dundalk, Monaghan United, Shamrock Rovers, St Patrick's Athletic and UCD entered the inaugural tournament. These eight clubs first played in a league stage featuring a single round of games. The top four from this stage – UCD, Shamrock Rovers, Bohemians and Bray Wanderers – then qualified for a final four tournament played at the National Basketball Arena. In the final, with a team coached by Dave Campbell and featuring Ciarán Kilduff and Dane Massey, Shamrock Rovers defeated UCD 4–2. St Patrick's Athletic won the second tournament in 2008  and Cork City, with a team featuring Kevin Long, were winners in 2009. Long was one of several future Republic of Ireland internationals who featured in the early tournaments. Others included David Meyler (Cork City), Séamus Coleman (Sligo Rovers) and James McClean (Derry City). Former Republic of Ireland international, Gary Kelly, played for Drogheda United in the 2008 tournament. Other players to feature included Gary McCabe and Jay O'Shea, both of whom played for Bray Wanderers.

Format 
As the number of entrants increased the format of the tournament changed. Fourteen clubs entered the 2009 competition and clubs initially played in three divisions – a Leinster Division, a Munster Division and a North-West Division. In 2010 the tournament was expanded to include clubs from the Emerald Futsal League in addition to futsal teams associated with League of Ireland clubs. Junior clubs and representative teams of junior leagues were also invited to participate, resulting in a record entry of 32 teams. The 2010 format saw four preliminary qualifying tournaments – one per province – been staged throughout the country.
The 2015 tournament featured eleven clubs.

Eden era
Playing under various names including, Sporting Fingal EID, EID Futsal  and Eden College, Eden Futsal Club won the FAI Futsal Cup five times in a row between 2010 and 2014.

Blue Magic
After finishing as runners up in 2010, 2011 and 2012, Blue Magic won the FAI Futsal Cup for the first time in 2015  and then retained the cup in 2016.

Finals

Notes
  After extra time

References

Ireland
Futsal competitions in the Republic of Ireland
Futsal
2007 establishments in Ireland